Carter Notch is a high mountain pass through the White Mountains of New Hampshire.  It is traversed only by hiking trails.  The notch is located in the Carter-Moriah Range within the White Mountain National Forest, in Bean's Purchase, Coos County, New Hampshire.  It is bordered to the west by Wildcat Mountain, and to the east by Carter Dome.  There are two small ponds in the notch, the Carter Lakes, as well as a large boulder field named The Ramparts. The ponds drain south through the talus barrier formed by The Ramparts.  The height of land is to the north.  To the north, the notch drains via Nineteenmile Brook, which flows into the Peabody River.  Drainage to the south is into the Wildcat River, which flows into the Saco River.

Located in the notch is the Appalachian Mountain Club's Carter Notch Hut (el. ).  The notch is accessible in winter by snowshoes or backcountry skis.

See also
List of mountain passes in New Hampshire

Notes

External links 
 AMC Carter Notch Hut (official site) - accessed 15 June 2008
 Hike the Whites: AMC Carter Notch Hut - accessed 15 June 2008
 

Notches of New Hampshire
Landforms of Coös County, New Hampshire
National Natural Landmarks in New Hampshire
Protected areas of Coös County, New Hampshire